Kunsthalle Weishaupt is an art gallery located in Ulm, in Baden-Würtemberg, Germany. It houses a private collection of modern art. The Kunsthalle Weishaupt was founded in 2007.

History
The Kunsthalle Weishaupt is owned by entrepreneur Siegfried Weishaupt. The construction of the building took place from 2005 to 2007, and cost 10 million euros. Weishaupt was awarded the contract for the design of the Kunsthalle Weishaupt.

References

External links

Contemporary art galleries in Germany
2007 establishments in Germany